Triplemanía X was the tenth Triplemanía professional wrestling show promoted by AAA. The show took place on July 5, 2002 in Madero, Mexico. The Main event featured a Lucha de Apuestas match where each wrestler defended the hair of a referee. The participants in this match were Heavy Metal, Sangre Chicana, El Oriental, Electroshock, May Flowers and El Brazo.

Production

Background
In early 1992 Antonio Peña was working as a booker and storyline writer for Consejo Mundial de Lucha Libre (CMLL), Mexico's largest and the world's oldest wrestling promotion, and was frustrated by CMLL's very conservative approach to lucha libre. He joined forced with a number of younger, very talented wrestlers who felt like CMLL was not giving them the recognition they deserved and decided to split from CMLL to create Asistencia Asesoría y Administración, later known simply as "AAA" or Triple A. After making a deal with the Televisa television network AAA held their first show in April 1992. The following year Peña and AAA held their first Triplemanía event, building it into an annual event that would become AAA's Super Bowl event, similar to the WWE's WrestleMania being the biggest show of the year. The 2002 Triplemanía was the 10th year in a row AAA held a Triplemanía show and the fifteenth overall show under the Triplemanía banner.

Storylines
The Triplemanía show featured eight professional wrestling matches with different wrestlers involved in pre-existing scripted feuds, plots and storylines. Wrestlers were portrayed as either heels (referred to as rudos in Mexico, those that portray the "bad guys") or faces (técnicos in Mexico, the "good guy" characters) as they followed a series of tension-building events, which culminated in a wrestling match or series of matches.

Results

Wagers in match 2
Heavy Metal represented Pepe Casas
Sangre Chicana represented El Tirantes
Oriental represented El Hijo del Tirantes
Electroshock represented Raul Copetes Salazar
May Flowers represented Piero
El Brazo represented El Fresero.

References

External links
Triplemanía X at LuchaLibreAAA.com

2002 in professional wrestling
Triplemanía
July 2002 events in Mexico